Interludes After Midnight is the fifth solo studio album by American hip hop producer Blockhead. It was released on Ninja Tune on April 30, 2012.

Critical reception

Aaron Matthews of Exclaim! described the album as "a bleary descent into the darker hours of night, evoking dollar cabs, cheap pizza and half-emptied 40 oz. bottles." D. M. Collins of L.A. Record called it "an album that follows through on the promise of hip hop and breakbeat that rarely gets fulfilled: full sample immersion that leaves its sources big and bold yet fully, delightfully rearranged, a true collage braided together lovingly with original combinations of boxy beats and tinkling treble tones." Roman Cooper of HipHopDX wrote, "While other producers release 'instrumental albums' that are little more than beat tapes, Blockhead provides a soundtrack for the listener's thoughts, regardless of how actively engaged they are."

Track listing

Personnel
Credits adapted from the CD liner notes.

 Blockhead – production
 Damien Paris – guitar, bass guitar
 Baby Dayliner – vocals (11), mixing
 Owen Brozman – artwork

References

External links
 

2012 albums
Blockhead (music producer) albums
Ninja Tune albums